Fairfield Township is the name of some places in the U.S. state of Michigan:

 Fairfield Township, Lenawee County, Michigan
 Fairfield Township, Shiawassee County, Michigan

Michigan township disambiguation pages